The Woman in Question (released in the United States as Five Angles on Murder) is a 1950 British murder mystery film directed by Anthony Asquith and starring Jean Kent, Dirk Bogarde and John McCallum. After a woman is murdered, the complex and very different ways in which she is seen by several people are examined.  It was loosely adapted into the 1954 Indian film Andha Naal.

Plot
English widow Agnes Huston is found murdered at her house. As Superintendent Lodge and Inspector Butler question her friends and neighbours, flashback scenes play out widely differing interpretations of the dead woman and her behaviour.

Neighbour Mrs. Finch tells Lodge that Agnes was a gentlewoman and her sister Catherine Taylor is rude and obnoxious. According to Mrs. Finch, the two sisters once had an argument about Agnes’ husband having an affair with Catherine. Catherine then left after hurting Agnes’ feelings. A few days later Catherine and her boyfriend Bob Baker forced their way into Agnes' flat. Finch ran to get the help of Mr. Pollard, the timid owner of a pet store opposite the building. Catherine and Baker threatened to kill everyone and left. This leads Lodge to question Catherine.

Catherine claims that the day she visited her sister, Mrs. Finch gave her a bad welcome. According to Catherine’s rendition, Agnes is a drunk, rude, and not-very-pleasant-looking woman. Catherine told Agnes that she went to visit Charles; however, Agnes accuses her and Charles of having an affair. They argue and Catherine leaves in contempt. She admits to dating Bob Baker and visiting Agnes in his company; however, Mrs. Finch refused to let them in.

Baker admits to meeting Agnes at her workplace, where she is a fortune teller. He, being a magician by profession, gave her a script for a mentalism act for her to go through, which she ignored. He visited her again two days later and Agnes attempted to seduce him, throwing him out when he refused. The day when he and Catherine went to visit Agnes, she treated them disrespectfully and asked them to get out.

Albert Pollard, a pet shop owner, portrays Agnes in a positive light. She once came into his shop to ask for help with her bird. When the bird dies, Pollard comforted Agnes and offered a parrot to replace it. On a following day, he was politely sent away from her place due to the arrival of Michael Murray, a merchant sailor. On the day Catherine and Baker barged in and Mrs. Finch asked for help, Pollard claims he bravely sent both of them away. He admits that Agnes had agreed to marry him the previous night before her death.

Michael Murray also admits to having met Agnes at her fortune-telling place. After beginning a relationship with Agnes, Murray set sail and returned after about three months. She immediately welcomes him and they kiss. Pollard sees the kiss and immediately leaves. On another night, Murray sees Agnes with Pollard and she dismisses his concerns, angering him. After three more months of sailing, he arrives at her house, to see another man in there and that she is possibly as a prostitute. Furious, he manhandles her and leaves in rage.

Lodge and Butler return to Mrs. Finches house to question her some more. In the Background Butler can be heard questioning the boy, who mentions that he hears the words, "Merry Christmas," which were the words Agnes had taught her original bird that had supposedly died thus alerting Lodge that Pollard's story contains lies. Lodge remarks that Pollard’s version of the story is the most unlikely of all. They ask Pollard to imagine a situation where Murray could have gotten drunk and entered Agnes' house to kill her. Pollard agrees that it must have happened that way. But when the killing happens Lodge switches the killer with Pollard, provoking a confession. Pollard confesses uncontrollably, and Lodge and Butler arrest Pollard.

Cast
 Jean Kent – Agnes/Astra
 Dirk Bogarde – Baker
 John McCallum – Michael Murray
 Susan Shaw – Catherine Taylor
 Hermione Baddeley – Mrs Finch
 Charles Victor – Albert Pollard
 Duncan Macrae – Superintendent Lodge
 Lana Morris – Lana Clark
 Joe Linnane – Inspector Butler
 Vida Hope – Shirley Jones

Critical reception
In The New York Times, Bosley Crowther wrote "It is not the mystery...so much as it is the nimble twists and wry indications of personality that give this little item its appeal. Jean Kent, who made herself distinctive in "The Browning Version" as the venomous wife, does a neat job of turning the lively facets of the woman in question in this piece...We won't guarantee this little Rank film will knock you out of your chair, but it will certainly twit your risibilities while mildly stimulating your nerves."

See also
Rashomon Effect
Andha Naal

References

External links

1950s mystery drama films
1950 films
British mystery drama films
Films directed by Anthony Asquith
British black-and-white films
1950s English-language films
1950s British films